Oregon Shores is a census-designated place (CDP) in Klamath County, Oregon, United States. It was first listed as a CDP prior to the 2020 census.

The CDP is in central Klamath County, on the eastern shore of Agency Lake.

Demographics

References 

Census-designated places in Klamath County, Oregon
Census-designated places in Oregon